Krejčí is a Czech surname meaning tailor. Notable people include:

 Cyril Krejčí, Czech volleyball player
 Daniel Krejčí (born 1992), Czech ice hockey player
 David Krejčí (born 1986), Czech ice hockey player for the Boston Bruins
 Iša Krejčí (1904–1968), Czech Neoclassicist composer, conductor and dramaturg
 Jan Krejčí (1825–1887), Czech educator, geologist, journalist and politician
 Jan Krejčí (chess player) (born 1992), Czech chess grandmaster
 Jaroslav Krejčí (1892–1956), Czechoslovak lawyer and politician
 Jaroslav Krejčí (sociologist) (1916–2014), Czech-British sociologist
 Jiří Krejčí (born 1986), Czech football player
 Josef Krejci (born 1911), Austrian field handball player
 Kateřina Krejčí (born 1947), Czech Television screenwriter
 Ladislav Krejčí (born 1992), Czech football player
 Ladislav Krejčí (born 1999), Czech football player
 Ludvík Krejčí, Czech general
 Lukáš Krejčí, Czechoslovak biathlete
 Lumír Krejčí, Czech biochemist
 Marek Krejčí (1980–2007), Slovak footballer
 Oskar Krejčí (born 1948), Czech political scientist
 Richard Krejčí (born 1970), Czech rower
 Rudolph Krejci, Czech-American philosopher

Places
 29473 Krejčí, a main belt asteroid
 Krejci Dump, a now defunct dump in Ohio

See also
 
 Krejčík
 Krejčír

Occupational surnames
Czech-language surnames